The 2019 United Kingdom general election in England was held on Thursday 12 December across 533 constituencies within England.

Results

Note: the above figures include the Speaker being counted in the Labour totals, despite the Speaker being non-partisan.

Analysis 
The Conservatives retained a majority of seats in England, with a net increase of 48 seats. They increased their share of the vote to their highest since 1970 and increased their share of the seats to their highest since 1987 and gained seats in the Labour Party's strongholds, specifically in areas which voted Leave in the 2016 EU referendum.

The Labour Party decreased their share of votes and suffered losses mostly to the Conservatives.

The Liberal Democrats increased their share of votes mostly in constituencies that voted Remain in the 2016 EU referendum, but failed to make any substantial gains in this election.

The Brexit Party gained votes from Labour, especially in Leave-voting constituencies, but failed to make any breakthrough in this election.

The Green Party increased its share of the vote but failed to make any gains, although it retained Brighton Pavilion.

Regional results

East Midlands

East of England

London

North East England

North West England

South East England

South West England

West Midlands

Yorkshire and the Humber 

Labour won the most seats in the region; however, the Conservatives won more votes.

Results by county

The below tables summarise the results by county as used by the Boundary Commission for England at the time of the last boundary review.

Avon

Bedfordshire

Berkshire

Buckinghamshire

Cambridgeshire

Cheshire

Cleveland

Cornwall

County Durham

Cumbria

Derbyshire

Devon

Dorset

East Sussex

Essex

Gloucestershire

Greater Manchester

Hampshire

Herefordshire

Hertfordshire

Humberside

Kent

Lancashire

Leicestershire and Rutland

Lincolnshire

Merseyside

Norfolk

Northamptonshire

Northumberland

North Yorkshire

Nottinghamshire

Oxfordshire

Shropshire

Somerset

South Yorkshire

Staffordshire

Suffolk

Surrey

Tyne and Wear

Warwickshire

West Midlands (county)

West Sussex

West Yorkshire

Wiltshire

Worcestershire

Results by constituency

Donations 

Electoral commission data shows that in 2019 Q4, total donations for each major political party, over £7,500, are as follows:

See also 
 2019 United Kingdom general election in Northern Ireland
 2019 United Kingdom general election in Scotland
 2019 United Kingdom general election in Wales

Notes

References

England
United Kingdom General Election Results In England, 2019
2019